Balkhab is a river in Sar-e Pol Province, Afghanistan.

References

Rivers of Afghanistan
Landforms of Sar-e Pol Province